is a Japanese masculine given name.

Notable people
 Yamato (born 1981), Japanese wrestler
, Japanese volleyball player
 , Japanese singer of the band Orange Range
 , Japanese baseball player

Fictional characters
 
 Yamato Kisaragi, the Ultimate Inventor from Danganronpa Another Despair Academy
 Yamato Minazuki, a character in the manga Kamikaze Kaito Jeanne
 Yamato Daiwa, character in the Battle B-Daman anime and manga series
 Yamato "Matt" Ishida, character in the anime and manga series Digimon Adventure and Digimon Adventure 02
 Yamato (Naruto), a character in the manga and anime Naruto
 Yamato Akitsuki, character in manga and anime Suzuka
 Yamato Kotobuki, character in the manga and anime Gals!
 Yamato Sora, Yamato Tokio and Dr. Yamato, characters in the original Japanese dub of Flint the Time Detective
 Yamato Nakano, a character from Loveless (manga)
 Yamato Agari, main character in Karakuri Dôji Ultimo
 Yamato Naoe, character in Maji de Watashi ni Koi Shinasai! (Majikoi ~ Oh! Samurai Girls)
 Yamato, a character in the manga One Piece
 , a character from Haikyu!! with the position of wing spiker from Fukurodani Academy

Japanese masculine given names